is a Japanese actress, voice actress, model and singer from Wakayama Prefecture who is affiliated with Beffect. She began her career as a child model and actress, appearing in magazines and commercials, before passing a voice acting audition and becoming a member of the idol group Earth Star Dream. In 2018, she was cast as the character Lisa Imai in the multimedia franchise BanG Dream!; as part of her responsibilities, she plays the bass for the band Roselia.

Biography
Nakashima was born in Wakayama Prefecture on September 12, 1997. She had been interested in entertainment from an early age, and she wanted to do something involving singing, acting, or dancing. While in junior high school, she joined a jazz music club where she learned how to play the bass guitar. She then became interested in voice acting after watching the anime series Gin Tama, an interest that would later grow after becoming familiar with the anime series Teekyu.

Nakashima began her career as a child model, appearing in the magazine JS Girl. She also appeared in a number of television commercials and dramas while affiliated with the talent agency Amuse. In 2014, at the urging of her mother, she participated in a voice acting audition held by the publishing company Earth Star Entertainment. She and Kanon Takao won the competition, beating 3,000 other contestants. Following the competition, she, Takao, and some of other the participants became part of the idol group Earth Star Dream. The following year, she made her voice acting debut in Teekyu.

In 2017, Nakashima was cast as Yūki Otokura in The Idolmaster Cinderella Girls. Later that year, she announced that she would leave Earth Star Dream and begin solo activities. Although she initially announced that she would remain with Earth Star Entertainment, she left the company in April 2018 after they announced that they would cease artist management activities. She then joined the talent agency Beffect. In May 2018, it was announced that she would be replacing Yurika Endō, who had announced her retirement from the entertainment industry, as the voice actor of the character Lisa Imai in the multimedia franchise BanG Dream!. As part of her new role, she joined the band Roselia as its bassist.

Personal life
Nakashima's interests include listening to music and playing the bass guitar. She had been interested in promoting Wakayama Prefecture, and in 2018 she became an ambassador for a campaign to promote the prefecture's orange industry. In 2019, she was appointed as a public relations officer by the prefectural government to further promote the area.

Since 2019 she maintains a gaming channel with her Roselia bandmate Megu Sakuragawa.

Filmography

Anime
2015
Teekyu as Kinako Tanaka
Castle Town Dandelion as Female Santa (episode 9)
A Simple Thinking About Blood Type

2016
Ooya-san wa Shishunki! as Asuka Mori
Onigiri as Veronica
Usakame as Kinako Tanaka

2017
Yu-Gi-Oh! VRAINS as Aoi Zaizen
The Idolmaster Cinderella Girls as Yūki Otokura
Himouto! Umaru-chan as Akira Asuka

2018
BanG Dream! Girls Band Party! Pico as Lisa Imai

2019
BanG Dream! 2nd Season as Lisa Imai
BanG Dream! Film Live as Lisa Imai

2020
BanG Dream! 3rd Season as Lisa Imai
BanG Dream! Girls Band Party! ☆ Pico ~Ohmori~ as Lisa Imai

2021
BanG Dream! Episode of Roselia (Yakusoku and Song I am.) as Lisa Imai
BanG Dream! Film Live 2nd Stage as Lisa Imai
BanG Dream! Girls Band Party! Pico Fever! as Lisa Imai

2022
The Genius Prince's Guide to Raising a Nation Out of Debt as Zeno
Idol Bu Show as Yui Kongōji
Cardfight!! Vanguard will+Dress as Mirei Minae
Prima Doll as Hо̄kiboshi

TBA
Gimai Seikatsu as Saki Ayase

Games

2015
Emil Chronicle Online

2017
The Idolmaster Cinderella Girls as Yūki Otokura

2018
BanG Dream! Girls Band Party! as Lisa Imai
Dragalia Lost as Elias

2020
Project Sekai: Colorful Stage! feat. Hatsune Miku as Shiho Hinomori

2022
Azur Lane as HMS Vanguard

Discography

Albums

Singles

References

External links
Official agency profile 

  

1997 births
Living people
Japanese child actresses
Japanese female models
Japanese video game actresses
Japanese voice actresses
Voice actors from Wakayama Prefecture
Voice actresses from Wakayama Prefecture
Models from Wakayama Prefecture
Anime singers
Japanese women pop singers
21st-century Japanese actresses
21st-century Japanese singers
21st-century Japanese women singers